is a Japanese school comedy/drama series aired on NTV at 21:00-21:54 every Saturday from October 11 to December 6, 2008. It consisted of nine episodes. Scrap Teacher was produced by Yuko Hazeyama and Masahiro Uchiyama from a screenplay by Fumie Mizuhashi. Its theme song was "Mayonaka no Shadow Boy" by Hey! Say! JUMP.

Synopsis
Shuzaburo Kusaka (Yuto Nakajima) is a junior high student attending a school which is due to close. He tries to learn despite the inept teachers and rowdy students. Toranosuke Sugi (Kamiji Yusuke), his homeroom teacher, is new and idealistic, unlike the other teachers. One day, Kusaka meets three boys, new students at the school: Tōichi Takasugi (Ryosuke Yamada), Eitarō Yoshida (Yuri Chinen), and Sugizō Irie (Daiki Arioka). They transfer to his class and work to change the ethos of the school.

Cast

Class 2-B
Yuto Nakajima as Shuzaburo Kusaka
Ryosuke Yamada as Tōichi Takasugi
Yuri Chinen as Eitarō Yoshida 
Daiki Arioka as Sugizō Irie
Misaki Takahata as Misaki Sawatari
Fuma Kikuchi as Fuma Kusumoto
Kento Nakajima as Kento Minobe
Sairi Ito as Sairi Osaki
Asami Tanaka as Manami Shinagawa
Mariya Nishiuchi as Mariya Ueno

Teachers
Yusuke Kamiji as Toranosuke Sugi
Ai Kato as Yuko Taki
Osamu Mukai as Satoshi Matsuo
Norito Yashima as Hisakimi Takasu
Yoko Minamino as Akimi Gōtokuji
Takeshi Masu as Shosuke Enokido
Kōji Nakamoto as Jon Sakita
Seiji Rokkaku as Hajime Yabuki

References

Japanese drama television series
Japanese comedy television series
Nippon TV dramas
2008 Japanese television series debuts
2008 Japanese television series endings
Television series about teenagers